Datooga may refer to:
the Datooga people
the Datooga language